42 Capricorni is a binary star system in the zodiac constellation of Capricornus. It has a combined apparent visual magnitude of 5.18, so it is faintly visible to the naked eye. Its annual parallax shift of 30.09 mas yields a distance estimate of about 108 light years; the system is moving closer to the Sun with a radial velocity of −1.2 km/s. 42 Capricorni is 0.2 degree south of the ecliptic and so is subject to lunar occultations.

This is a double-lined close spectroscopic binary with an orbital period of 13.174 days and an eccentricity of 0.18. The binary nature of this system was discovered in 1918 by the English astronomer Joseph Lunt. It has a combined spectrum that matches a stellar classification of G1 IV, with the individual components having estimated classes of G1 V and G2 V. This is an RS Canum Venaticorum variable, indicating the presence of an active chromosphere with star spots. The system is a source of X-ray emission.

References

RS Canum Venaticorum variables
G-type main-sequence stars
Capricorni, BY
Capricornus (constellation)
BD-14 6102
Capricorni, 42
206301
107095
8283
G-type subgiants